NGC 4274 is a barred spiral galaxy located in the constellation Coma Berenices.  It is located at a distance of circa 45 million light years from Earth, which, given its apparent dimensions, means that NGC 4274 is about 95,000 light years across. It was discovered by William Herschel in 1785.

Characteristics 
NGC 4274 is characterised by its overlapping outer arms, forming a ring structure with apparent diameter 2′.8. The inner arms begin near the edge of the bulge and they are bright and dusty, with dust lanes that are more prominent at the near side. Outside the near-ring a set of fainter outer arms has been detected. These outer arms also form a ring, with diameter 5′.9. A third rings exists near the nucleus. The nuclear ring has semimajor axis 9", which corresponds to 680 parsec at that distance.

The bar of the galaxy is 5 kpc long. The galaxy features a nuclear bar that is almost perpendicular to the outer bar.

Supernova 
One supernova has been observed in NGC 4274, SN 1999ev. It was a type II supernova, discovered by Tom Boles on 7 November 1999. It peaked at magnitude 15.2.

Nearby galaxies 
NGC 4274 is the foremost member of a galaxy group known as NGC 4274 group. Other members of the group are NGC 4173, NGC 4245, NGC 4251, NGC 4283, IC 3215, NGC 4310, and NGC 4314. It is part of the Coma I Group which is part of the Virgo Supercluster.

Gallery

References

External links 

Barred spiral galaxies
Coma Berenices
4274
07377
39724
Coma I Group